PNU-91356A (U-91356) is a drug used in scientific research which acts as a potent and reasonably selective agonist of the dopamine receptor D2, with lower affinity for the related D3 and D4 subtypes and the 5-HT1A receptor.

References 

Dopamine agonists